L’Europe Ensemble Delegation to the European Parliament, originally called Renaissance, is a delegation of French MEP's to the European Parliament. It was formed ahead of the 2019 European Parliament election as a unified list of La République En Marche!, the Democratic Movement, as well as other smaller liberal and centrist parties.

History 
In March 2019, Les Échos reported that the choice of lead candidate was to be made internally between either health minister Agnès Buzyn or European affairs minister Nathalie Loiseau. Loiseau officially announced she would seek the nomination for lead candidate following her debate with Marine Le Pen on the set of L'Émission politique on 14 March, while Les Échos and Le Parisien later reported that Buzyn withdrew her name from consideration. Loiseau was officially designated as lead candidate on 26 March as the list of the first 30 candidates was unveiled. Alain Juppé was the subject of early speculation regarding his potential candidacy to lead the list, though confirmed on 19 March 2018 that he would not stand, and his appointment to the Constitutional Council precluded his participation in the campaign, but he indicated he would have supported Macron's list.

LaREM was expected to sign a cooperation agreement with the ALDE group for the 2019 European Parliament election. However, owing to the Gilets Jaunes protests and the rise of national populism within France, Macron opted to run a campaign focusing more on electing representatives of his party to the European Parliament, than campaigning for ALDE. Macron styled his campaign as "Renaissance", calling for a renaissance across Europe. The electoral slate which comprised LaREM, MoDem and other parties was subsequently named the Renaissance List.

On 17 December 2017, at the congress of the Democratic Movement (MoDem), Christophe Castaner said he supported an "enlarged list" for the European elections based on their alliance, and on 26 September 2018, the movement officially announced the opening of applications for prospective candidates from civil society, receiving 2,673 in total, winnowed by an investiture committee chaired by Jean-Marc Borello. Former Élysée advisor Stéphane Séjourné was designated campaign director on 29 October, tasked with creating a list alongside Agir, and seeking a lead candidate with a "green profile". For the MoDem, Bayrou selected Régis Lefebvre to serve as deputy campaign director.

On 15 February, Challenges revealed that EELV MEP Pascal Durand would be on the list in an electable position and Séjourné in the top 25 places. The centre-right party Agir proposed several candidates for the list, including two in electable position: Nicolas Barnier (the son of Michel Barnier and a parliamentary assistant), as well as Fabienne Keller, Gilles Boyer, Élisabeth Morin-Chartier, and Xavier Fournier. In an interview published in Challenges on 6 February, Radical Movement co-president Laurent Hénart indicated that the movement would likely vote to join a common list, sparking dissent among some ex-PRG members including co-president Sylvia Pinel, who announced her departure from the party to resurrect the PRG on two days later. The candidates it proposed included outgoing MEP Dominique Riquet, Olga Johnson, and Mélanie Fortier. One outgoing MEP, Jean Arthuis, announced that he would not seek to run again in 2019, and Agir MEP Tokia Saïfi also retired, as did the party's other MEP Élisabeth Morin-Chartier after learning she would not be in electable position on the list. Foreign nationals were also be on the list, including former Italian undersecretary for European affairs Sandro Gozi. After declining to run as a lead candidate, Canfin ultimately appeared in second on the list.

La République En Marche considered alliances with similar European political parties including Citizens in Spain and the Democratic Party in Italy, as well as parties outside of the Alliance of Liberals and Democrats for Europe (ALDE). Pieyre-Alexandre Anglade was delegated with the task of forming contacts with potential European partners. On 9 September 2018, Guy Verhofstadt, leader of the ALDE group, claimed that La République En Marche would ally with ALDE, which Castaner denied. Reports in October indicated Macron and Dutch prime minister Mark Rutte reached an agreement in principle for an alliance, though Anglade emphasized that ALDE parties would merely serve as the foundation, with EPP parties on the right such as Civic Platform in Poland and New Democracy in Greece as well as PES parties on the left including the Democratic Party in Italy and the Social Democratic Party of Austria in consideration. The party considered recruiting MEPs to form a group after the election. Following the airing of a report on France 2 on 11 March about ALDE's financial backing from Monsanto, manufacturer of glyphosate, the party announced that it would not join the ALDE, leading the latter to announce it would no longer accept corporate donations. Verhofstadt later announced on 2 May that the ALDE group would be dissolved after the elections to ally and create a new group. Following the election, the ALDE parliamentary group reformed into Renew Europe, incorporating Macron's Renaissance.

Composition

Leaders

Election results

European Parliament

References 

European Parliament
2010s in French politics